Lamont Eugene Brightful (born January 29, 1979) is an American football player. Prior to attending Eastern Washington University, Brightful graduated from Mariner High School in Everett, Washington, where he was a standout defensive back, wide receiver, and kick returner.

College career
Brightful played college football at Eastern Washington University.  He was drafted by the Baltimore Ravens in the 2002 NFL Draft. He was also a skilled kick returner, he holds the Div 1AA record for average kick return yards at 30, with over 65 attempts.

Professional career
After he was drafted in the sixth round, he played for the Ravens during the 2002 and 2003 seasons, where he was used mostly as a return man.

Brightful was released by the Ravens at the conclusion of the preseason in 2004 and signed with the Miami Dolphins. He was released from the team in 2005. Brightful was cut after having three fumbles in a game as a punt returner against the Cincinnati Bengals.

Brightful was then picked up by the New York Giants and went overseas to play for the Frankfurt Galaxy as cornerback.  In 2005, he was ranked the top returner in the league.

In 2006, he joined the Montreal Alouettes in the Canadian Football League as a punt returner and cornerback.

Brightful works as an elite sports performance coach in Richland, Washington at Power Alley Performance, LLC.

References

External links
Just Sports Stats

1979 births
Living people
People from Oak Harbor, Washington
Players of American football from Washington (state)
American football cornerbacks
American football return specialists
Baltimore Ravens players
New York Giants players
Montreal Alouettes players
Calgary Stampeders players
Eastern Washington Eagles football players
Miami Dolphins players